The San Diego Chargers (now Los Angeles) announced their 50th anniversary team in 2009 to honor the top players and coaches in the history of the National Football League team. The Chargers were founded in 1959 as part of the American Football League. The anniversary team included 53 players and coaches selected from 103 nominees. The Chargers originally stated that only 50 members would be selected; the group is still sometimes referred to as the 50 Greatest Chargers. Online voting by fans accounted for 50 percent of the voting results; votes from Chargers Hall of Famers and five members of the local media made up for the other 50 percent. Over 400,000 votes were cast online. Dan Fouts and LaDainian Tomlinson received the first and second most votes, respectively. The team features eight Pro Football Hall of Fame members and 11 players that were active on the 2009 Chargers team.

Key

Offense

Defense

Special teams

Coaches

See also
 San Diego Chargers 40th Anniversary Team
 Los Angeles Chargers Hall of Fame

References

San Diego Chargers 50th Anniversary Team
Anniversary Team 50th
San Diego Chargers 50th Anniversary Team
San Diego Chargers 50th Anniversary Team